The Arroyo del Agua Formation is a geologic formation in New Mexico. It preserves fossils dating back to the  early Permian period.

Description
These lie conformably on the El Cobre Canyon Formation and are in turn overlain in most locations by the Shinarump Conglomerate. In a few locations in the southernmost Chama Basin, there is a tongue of De Chelly Sandstone between the Arroyo del Agua and Shinarump.

The formation is 58% siltstone and 34% sandstone, with minor conglomerate and calcrete (each about 4%). The siltstone beds also contain numerous calcrete nodules, and they form thick slopes between thin sandstone sheets. The sandstone sheets themselves are coarse, arkosic, and trough crossbedded. The minor conglomerate beds are mostly composed of intraformational calcrete clasts, but conglomerate beds containing extraformational quartzite clasts are more common in the upper part of the formation. The formation is well exposed in the walls of El Cobre Canyon and in the valley of the Rio Puerco.

The formation superficially resembles the underlying El Cobre Canyon Formation. However, the siltstone beds are more orange in color than the brown beds of the underlying El Cobre Canyon Formation, allowing the two to be easily distinguished. Other distinguishing characteristics include the multistoried sandstone beds of the El Cobre Canyon Formation compared with the thin sandstone sheets of the Arroyo del Agua Formation; the thin siltstone beds of the El Cobre Canyon Formation compared with the thick siltstone beds of the Arrroyo del Agua Formation; the greater amount of extraformational conglomerate in the El Cobre Canyon Formation; and the much more calcareous nature of the beds of the El Cobre Canyon Formation compared with the Arroyo del Agua Formation.

The Arroyo del Agua Formation correlates with the upper Abo Formation to the south.

Fossils
Compared with the underlying El Cobre Canyon Formation, the Arroyo del Agua Formation is relatively scarce in age-diagnostic fossils. Only two locations have yielded such fossils, which included a Sphenacodon bone bed high on the eastern wall of El Cobre Canyon and a Seymouria bone bed north of Youngsville on the Rio Puerco. These indicate a late Wolfcampian age.

History of investigation
Although the Cutler Formation in the Chama Basin has been well studied for its fossil fauna since the Macomb expedition of 1858, its lithology was long neglected. Dalton mapped the Permian redbeds of the Chama Basin as Abo Formation in 1928. In 1946, Wood and Northrop mapped the Pennsylvanian-Permian red beds north of latitude 36 degrees as Cutler Formation and south of that latitude as Abo Formation. It was not until 2005 that the lithology of these beds was well enough characterized for it to be raised to group status and divided into the lower El Cobre Canyon Formation and upper Arroyo del Agua Formation by Lucas and Krainer in 2005.

Footnotes

See also

 List of fossiliferous stratigraphic units in New Mexico
 Paleontology in New Mexico

References

Further reading
 
 

Permian formations of New Mexico